Pultenaea elusa, commonly known as elusive bush-pea, is a species of flowering plant in the family Fabaceae and is endemic to a small area of New South Wales. It is a low shrub with sharply-pointed linear leaves, and dense clusters of yellow to orange and red to purple flowers. It has not been seen since 1938.

Description

Taxonomy and naming
Elusive bush-pea was first formally described in 1994 by John D. Briggs and Michael Crisp and was given the name Pultenaea parrisiae subsp. elusa in the journal Telopea from specimens collected in 1938 by William Blakely from swamps near Wingello. In 2004, Rogier Petrus Johannes de Kok raised the subspecies to species status as Pultenaea elusa. The specific epithet (elusa) is from a Latin word meaning "to avoid, evade or frustrate", referring to the lack of success in relocating populations of this species.

Distribution and habitat

Conservation status
Pultenaea elusa is classified as "endangered" under the Australian Government Environment Protection and Biodiversity Conservation Act 1999 and as "critically endangered" under the New South Wales Government Biodiversity Conservation Act 2016.

References

elusa
Flora of New South Wales
Plants described in 1994